The Catholic Church in Ivory Coast is part of the worldwide Catholic Church, under the spiritual leadership of the Pope in Rome. Catholicism arrived in Ivory Coast through the arrival of French settlers.

The Catholic Church is the world's largest Christian church, and its largest religious grouping. There are an estimated 2.8 million baptised Catholics in Ivory Coast, 17.2% of the population (according to the 2014 Census), in 15 dioceses. There are 800 priests and 1,500 men and women in religious orders.

The Basilica of Our Lady of Peace of Yamoussoukro in Yamoussoukro, is the largest church in the world, larger even than St. Peter's Basilica in Rome.

Within Ivory Coast the hierarchy consists of:
Archbishopric
Bishopric

Abidjan
Agboville
Grand-Bassam
Yopougon
Bouaké
Abengourou
Bondoukou
Yamoussoukro
Gagnoa
Daloa
Man
San Pedro-en-Côte d'Ivoire
Korhogo
Katiola
Odienné

See also
Mario Roberto Cassari
Monsignor Ambrose Madtha
Joseph Spiteri

References

 
Ivory Coast